Gerald Pring (1888 – 1970) was a British stage and film actor. He played a number of supporting roles in British and American films during the silent and sound eras.

In 1930 he appeared in the West End in the comedy Almost a Honeymoon.

Selected filmography
 The Lady of the Photograph (1917)
 Milestones (1920)
 The Palace of Darkened Windows (1920)
 The Nut (1921)
 Desert Blossoms (1921)
 Live and Let Live (1921)
 The Bronze Bell (1921)
 The Fighting Streak (1922)
 Man Under Cover (1922)
 June Madness (1922)
 Confidence (1922)
 Broken Chains (1922)
 Always the Woman (1922)
 Bolibar (1928)
 Three Witnesses (1935)
 Well Done, Henry (1936)
 The Dark Eyes of London (1939)
 The Echo Murders (1945)
 Loyal Heart (1946)
 Black Memory (1947)
 My Brother's Keeper (1948)
 No Way Back (1949)

References

Bibliography 
 Jeffrey Vance & Tony Maietta. Douglas Fairbanks. University of California Press, 2008.
 Wearing, J.P. The London Stage 1930-1939: A Calendar of Productions, Performers, and Personnel.  Rowman & Littlefield, 2014.

External links 
 

1888 births
1970 deaths
British male film actors
British male stage actors
People from Twickenham